Luana Vjollca (born 2 September 1991), also known mononymously as Luana, is an Albanian television presenter, host, singer and model.

Life and career 

Luana Vjollca was born on 2 September 1991 into an Albanian family of the Roman Catholic faith in the city of Tirana, then part of the People's Republic of Albania, present Albania. Her parents originated from the city of Shkodër. Her elder sister, Marina Vjollca, is also a well-established television presenter and model in the Albanian-speaking world.

Discography

Singles

As lead artist

References 

1991 births
21st-century Albanian women singers
Albanian Roman Catholics
Albanian television actresses
Albanian television personalities
Albanian women television presenters
Living people
People from Tirana
Sony Music artists